Port Angeles School District No. 121 is a public school district in Port Angeles, Washington, United States.   It serves the city of Port Angeles and surrounding rural areas, and the nearby Lower Elwha Klallam Tribe.  The district's operations are supported by Educational Service District 121.  In November 2015, the district had a total enrollment of 3,985 students.  The Port Angeles School District stretches from McDonald Creek in the east to Lake Crescent in the west, and from the northern coastline of the Straits of Juan de Fuca to the foothills of Olympic National Park in the south.

The district's collaborative relationship with the Lower Elwha Tribe has been celebrated since 1996 in an Annual Potlatch hosted by the tribe.

Schools
The district operates five elementary schools, one middle school, a high school, an alternative high school and a vocational school.

Preschools
While there is no explicitly set preschool in port Angeles school district, the preschools available for students 3–5 years old(and potty trained) typically rotate once per year. Only one preschool is available per year. However, a developmental preschool program focusing on games, songs, and more activities is included in Dry Creek, Roosevelt and Jefferson elementary

Elementary schools
Each of the five elementary schools have enrollments of 300-400 students which serve kindergarten through the 6th grade. They have basic education, and various special programs in psychical and music categories, serving strings for 4-6 and band for 6th graders. Three of these schools also have transitional kindergarten programs for 4 year old kids who need more time to prepare for kindergarten the following year.

Dry Creek Elementary School serves mostly rural students west of Port Angeles and from the Lower Elwha Klallam tribal reservation. One of three schools that contains transitional kindergarten
Franklin Elementary School serves students in east Port Angeles. One of three schools that contains transitional kindergarten
Hamilton Elementary School serves students in west Port Angeles. Contains a developmental kindergarten program for 5 year old students who need extra time to be developmentally ready for their first year of school, with categories such as Autism, developmentally delayed, etc.
Jefferson Elementary School serves students in central Port Angeles. Contains a Responsive behavior program for students who cause trouble on a frequent basis. 
Roosevelt Elementary School serves mostly rural students east of Port Angeles. One of three schools that contains transitional kindergarten programs.

Middle schools
Stevens Middle School has an average enrollment of 600 students, has won state honors in science education and was named among the top 22 middle schools in the state in 2011 and 2012. It has a strong education focus, with various classes in music band, orchestra, economics, language classes, and vocational classes. It also has multiple sports programs and an intensified math sequence. This school, along with Jefferson elementary, has a responsive behavior development program for problematic students who have frequently caused trouble at the school.

High schools
Port Angeles High School. Port Angeles high school has various sports programs at the 3A state level, an award winning music program with bands and choirs, a large set of fine arts and vocational courses, as well as NROJTC  military programs.

Alternative schools and programs
Lincoln High School — alternative high school that serves approximately 50 students. Here students are given the opportunity, understanding, and encouragement needed to help each student become a successful person. Basic skills and other post-secondary education is the primary focus. Unlike port Angeles high school, no sports programs or music programs are available, and only the basic English, math, science, and other classes that are required for graduation are present. The credit requirements however, remain the same as port Angeles high school.
Parents as Partners — homeschool program.
Seaview Academy - Virtual school program. Serves students in all grades(with the exception of preschool level) K-12.

Governance
The district is governed by a board of directors elected from the district at large. Each of the five directors is elected for a term of four years.  Two are elected in one two-year election cycle and the other three in the alternate cycle.

The school board president is Steven Baxter.

References

External links
School Board webpae
OSPI school district report card 2012-2013

School districts in Washington (state)
Education in Clallam County, Washington